Phyllocnistis unipunctella is a moth of the family Gracillariidae. It is known from all of Europe.

The wingspan is 7–8 mm. A whitish moth with yellowish suffusion and a distinct black spot near the wing apex. The forewings are shining white, posteriorly more or less ochreous-tinged; often a suffused spot on dorsum near base and a larger one in middle of disc dark fuscous; a transverse dark fuscous line at 2/3, preceded by one and followed by two dark fuscous streaks from costa; a round black apical dot; three dark fuscous diverging bars in apical cilia. Hindwings are light grey. The larva is pale green.
 
Adults are on wing in July and from September onwards, sometimes overwintering in haystacks.

The larvae feed on Populus balsmifera, Populus x canadensis, Populus candicans, Populus deltoides, Populus euphratica, Populus gileadensis, Populus nigra, Populus simonii, Populus suaveolens and Populus trichocarpa. They mine the leaves of their host plant. The mine consists of long, broad, epidermal corridor that winds in dense loops over the upper-side of the leaf without crossing itself. The frass is deposited in a continuous, vague central line. The mine ends at the leaf margin, where the corridor is slightly widened, and in which some silk is deposited to create a pupal chamber. When this dries, the leaf margin somewhat folds over. The mine has a strong resemblance to the trail of dried mucus left by a small snail.

References

Phyllocnistis
Moths of Japan
Moths of Europe
Moths of Asia